Kavita Srinivasan is an Indian actress, producer, director and screenwriter based in Nepal. She is known for the Nepali online sitcom P.S. Zindagi (2016).

Personal life
Srinivasan grew up in Papua New Guinea, Zambia, India, and USA. She studied Biochemistry from Brandeis University and completed her Bachelor’s degree in Architecture and City Planning from the Massachusetts Institute of Technology (MIT). She also takes part in theater and productions.

Career
Srinivasan made her Hindi debut in Kurbaan in 2009 and has starred in South Indian movies as well. She made her Telugu debut in the movie Kalicharan in 2013 and her Tamil debut in Adiyum Andamum in 2014.

Srinivasan also appeared in a 2011 documentary  In Search of God which depicts the transformative journey of an American woman who finds deeper meaning in her life after traveling to a mystical island in India where the inhabitants use artistic expression as a means for communing with God.

Srinivasan made her Nepali debut in the online sitcom P.S. Zindagi of which she is the producer, writer and creator as well. She plays the role of Juna Akhtar and stars opposite Sujata Koirala who plays the role of her sister, Kokab Akhtar.

Filmography

Films

Theatre

References

External links

Year of birth missing (living people)
Living people
Indian film actresses
Actresses in Hindi cinema
Actresses in Tamil cinema
Actresses in Telugu cinema
Indian stage actresses
Indian web series actresses
Nepalese web series actresses
Indian theatre managers and producers
Indian women theatre directors
Indian women screenwriters
Tamil actresses
Indian expatriates in Papua New Guinea
Indian expatriates in Zambia
Indian expatriates in the United States
Indian expatriate actresses in Nepal
Brandeis University alumni
MIT School of Architecture and Planning alumni
21st-century Indian actresses